
Gmina Dmosin is a rural gmina (administrative district) in Brzeziny County, Łódź Voivodeship, in central Poland.

The gmina contains part of the protected area called Łódź Hills Landscape Park.

Villages
Gmina Dmosin contains the villages and settlements of Borki, Dąbrowa Mszadelska, Dmosin, Dmosin Drugi, Dmosin Pierwszy, Grodzisk, Janów, Kałęczew, Kamień, Kołacin, Kołacinek, Koziołki, Kraszew, Kraszew Wielki, Kuźmy, Lubowidza, Michałów, Nadolna, Nadolna-Kolonia, Nagawki, Nowostawy Dolne, Osiny, Osiny-Zarębów, Rozdzielna, Szczecin, Teresin, Wiesiołów, Wola Cyrusowa, Wola Cyrusowa-Kolonia, Ząbki and Zawady.

Neighbouring gminas
Gmina Dmosin is bordered by the gminas of Brzeziny, Głowno, Lipce Reymontowskie, Łyszkowice, Rogów and Stryków.

References
Polish official population figures 2006

Dmosin
Brzeziny County